Till I Met You is a 2016 Philippine romantic comedy television series directed by Antoinette Jadaone, starring James Reid, Nadine Lustre and JC Santos. The series premiered on ABS-CBN's Primetime Bida evening block and worldwide on The Filipino Channel on August 29, 2016, replacing Dolce Amore.

The romantic comedy follows the story of three friends — Sebastian (Basti), a boy; Iris, a girl; and Alejandro (Ali), a closeted homosexual - who eventually fall in love with each other and find themselves in an unusual love triangle.

Urban Luzon/NUTAM (Nationwide Urban) ratings are provided by AGB Nielsen Philippines while the nationwide ratings are provided by Kantar Media Philippines.

Series overview

Episodes

August 2016

September 2016

October 2016

November 2016

December 2016

January 2017

References 

Lists of Philippine drama television series episodes